Delissea argutidentata is a species of flowering plant in the Hawaiian lobelioids section of the Campanulaceae family, native to Hawaii (island). The species was long thought to be extinct, but in March 2021 three individuals were discovered growing in an undisclosed location on the Big Island of Hawaii, and efforts are underway to use their seeds to re-establish the species elsewhere.

Delissea argutidentata can grow up to 35 feet tall, which is much taller than other species in the Campanulaceae. The plants have a palm-like trunk topped by a round cluster of simple leaves. They previously inhabitated the bottoms and slopes of old volcanic craters and could be found in the understory of Acacia koa forests.

References

Lobelioideae
Endemic flora of Hawaii
Plants described in 1959